Sympistis horus is a moth of the family Noctuidae first described by James T. Troubridge in 2008. It is found in New Mexico.

The wingspan is about 32 mm.

References

horus
Moths described in 2008